Preston Gubbalds is a small village in Shropshire, England. It lies on the A528 Shrewsbury-Ellesmere road and is in the parish of Pimhill.

The name, spelt Preston Gubbalds or Preston Gobald  in some historical sources, is derived from the Old English for "priest's settlement", along with the name of Godebold or Godbold, a priest who was subtenant of the manor in 1066 and at the time of the Domesday Book survey. The same man also held PREEN,  LACK, ATCHAM AND UCKINGTON.  According to the Rotuli Hundredorum. [II. 75. 172]  Preston Gobald coupled with Bosshall, was said to be held by [Sir] Thomas de Boshall, as mentioned in the Nomina Villlarum of 1316.
To the west is the large village of Bomere Heath (once a hamlet of Preston Gubbals parish) and to the south is the small village of Albrighton. 

The village church is dedicated to St. Martin and contains a mediaeval chancel, that became the south aisle when additions including a tower, nave and chancel, were made in the 19th century. It became redundant in 1973, the additions were demolished, and the building now belongs the Churches Conservation Trust.

To the north of the village, as the A528 passes by Pim Hill, is Lea Hall, a notable Elizabethan brick house, and its dovecote.

See also
Listed buildings in Pimhill

References

External links

Villages in Shropshire